The Dawson Woman's Club was founded in 1905 as the "Wednesday Afternoon Club" and became a member of the Georgia Federation of Women's Clubs in 1907.

The Dawson Woman's Clubhouse, in Dawson, Georgia, is a log cabin structure which was built in 1913.  It was listed on the National Register of Historic Places in 1982, and was delisted in 2019 because it had been moved.  As of 2018, it had been moved to the southwest corner of 7th Avenue and Stonewall Street.

The building is a log cabin built for public use, made "of round, saddle-notched, unchinked logs that rest on a primitive pier foundation composed of stacked fieldstones."

The building is now known as the Log Cabin Club House, and is offered for rent for events.  It was for some time located at 360 6th Avenue, NE, in Dawson.

The woman's club became inactive by 1950, and was reorganized as the Dawson Woman's Garden Club or  Dawson Garden Club.  According to the Terrell County Historic Preservation Society, "community improvement has continued to be a goal, although limited to the area of city beautification."

The house belonged to the Dawson Garden Club from 1950 to 1994, when it was transferred to the Dawson Restoration Society (now the Terrell County Historic Preservation Society).

See also

Tennille Woman's Clubhouse, Tennille, Georgia, also a log building, also NRHP-listed

Notes

References

Log cabins
Women's club buildings in Georgia (U.S. state)
National Register of Historic Places in Terrell County, Georgia
Buildings and structures completed in 1913
Former National Register of Historic Places in Georgia
History of women in Georgia (U.S. state)